Carlos Eduardo Quishpe (born July 21, 1991) is an Ecuadorian cyclist riding for Team Ecuador. He was named in the startlist for the 2015 World Time Trial Championships.

References

1991 births
Living people
Ecuadorian male cyclists
South American Games gold medalists for Ecuador
South American Games medalists in cycling
Competitors at the 2010 South American Games
Pan American Games competitors for Ecuador
Cyclists at the 2011 Pan American Games
Cyclists at the 2019 Pan American Games
21st-century Ecuadorian people